The 1956 United States presidential election in Georgia took place on November 6, 1956, as part of the 1956 United States presidential election. Georgia voters chose 12 representatives, or electors, to the Electoral College, who voted for president and vice president.

Georgia was won by Adlai Stevenson (D–Illinois), running with Senator Estes Kefauver, with 66.48% of the popular vote against incumbent President Dwight D. Eisenhower (R–Pennsylvania), running with Vice President Richard Nixon, with 32.65% of the popular vote.

Results

Results by congressional districts

Results by county

Notes

References

Georgia
1956
1956 Georgia (U.S. state) elections